Jan Anders Hovdan (born 4 June 1950) is a retired Norwegian football midfielder. He started his career in Lyn, but did not break through and went on to Frigg. He also represented Norway as an U19 and senior international.

References

1950 births
Living people
Footballers from Oslo
Norwegian footballers
Lyn Fotball players
Frigg Oslo FK players
Norway youth international footballers
Norway international footballers
Association football midfielders